Hubrechtia is a monotypic genus of worms belonging to the family Hubrechtiidae. The only species is Hubrechtia desiderata.

The species inhabits marine environments.

References

Nemerteans